Régis Dorn (born 22 December 1979) is a French former professional footballer who played as a striker. He was the top scorer of the 3. Liga in 2009–10, having scored 22 goals all through the season.

References

External links
 

Living people
1979 births
French people of German descent
French footballers
Association football forwards
FC Mulhouse players
SC Freiburg players
RC Strasbourg Alsace players
En Avant Guingamp players
Amiens SC players
Kickers Offenbach players
FC Hansa Rostock players
SV Sandhausen players
Bundesliga players
2. Bundesliga players
3. Liga players
French expatriate footballers
French expatriate sportspeople in Germany
Expatriate footballers in Germany
French expatriate sportspeople in China
Expatriate footballers in China